The 2002 Dodge/Save Mart 350 was the 16th stock car race of the 2002 NASCAR Winston Cup Series and the 14th iteration of the event. The race was held on Sunday, June 23, 2002, in Sonoma, California, at the club layout in Infineon Raceway, a  permanent road course layout. The race took the scheduled 110 laps to complete. Ricky Rudd, driving for Robert Yates Racing, would take advantage of a disaster-stricken Jerry Nadeau when Nadeau suffered rear end problems while leading with three to go. The win was Rudd's 23rd and final NASCAR Winston Cup Series win and his first and only win of the season. To fill out the podium, Tony Stewart of Joe Gibbs Racing and Terry Labonte of Hendrick Motorsports would finish second and third, respectively.

Background 

Infineon Raceway is one of two road courses to hold NASCAR races, the other being Watkins Glen International. The Chute was only used for NASCAR events such as this race, and was criticized by many drivers, who preferred the full layout.

Entry list 

 (R) denotes rookie driver.

Practice

First practice 
The first practice session was held on Friday, June 21, at 10:20 AM PST, and would last for two hours.

Second practice 
The second practice session was held on Saturday, June 22, at 9:30 AM PST, and would last for 45 minutes.

Third and final practice 
The third and final practice session, sometimes referred to as Happy Hour, was held on Saturday, June 22, at 11:15 AM PST, and would last for 45 minutes.

Qualifying 
Qualifying was held on Friday, June 21, at 2:05 PM PST. Drivers would each have one lap to set a lap time. Positions 1-36 would be decided on time, while positions 37-43 would be based on provisionals. Six spots are awarded by the use of provisionals based on owner's points. The seventh is awarded to a past champion who has not otherwise qualified for the race. If no past champ needs the provisional, the next team in the owner points will be awarded a provisional.

Two drivers would fail to qualify: Stacy Compton and Brandon Ash.

Full qualifying results

Race results

References 

2002 NASCAR Winston Cup Series
NASCAR races at Sonoma Raceway
June 2002 sports events in the United States
2002 in sports in California